Stoke Works railway station was a station in the hamlet of Stoke Prior in the English county of Worcestershire, near Bromsgrove.

It was located on the Stoke Works Branch, which is still in operation carrying trains from Droitwich Spa to Bromsgrove. It was the only intermediate station on the line and was opened primarily for the workforce at the Stoke Prior Works. The works are no longer in operation and the car spelled the end for the station.

References

Further reading

Disused railway stations in Worcestershire
Beeching closures in England
Former Great Western Railway stations
Railway stations in Great Britain opened in 1852
Railway stations in Great Britain closed in 1966
1852 establishments in England